Jason Sizemore is an American writer and editor based in Lexington, Kentucky. He is the owner and managing editor of Apex Publications.

Early life
Sizemore was born in Big Creek, Kentucky (pop. 400).

Career
Sizemore was the editor and publisher of Apex Digest, a quarterly science fiction and horror digest that ran for 12 issues between 2005 and 2008. As the publisher/managing editor of Apex Magazine, he was nominated for the Hugo Award in the semiprozine category in 2012, 2013 and 2014.

As a writer he has published several stories in genre magazines. His first short story collection, Irredeemable, was published in April, 2014.

Bibliography

Collections
 Irredeemable (2014)  .

Fiction
 Life Imitating Art, Version 1A – The Lunatic Chameleon, Issue Two.
 Life Imitating Art, Version 1B – Whispers of Wickedness.
 The Boiler Room – Lost in the Dark (no longer published).
 Gus's Good day – Swamp.net (no longer published).
 Blue Lights – The Wheel, Spring 2005.
 Preacher Ira May Bowling – Mt. Zion Press, Issue #1.
 Faithless – Surreal, Issue #4
 The Sleeping Quartet – Forgotten Worlds, Issue #6
 An Ingenious Adventure – Future Syndicate Anthology  (2007).
 The Horror of It All (Four Sizemore Stories)
 Breaking Up Is Hard to Do
 God Needs Not The Future - Streets of Shadows  (2014).
 Yellow Warblers  (2009).

Nonfiction
 Silent Hill Game reviews – Issue #9, City Slab
 Resident Evil Game Reviews – Issue #8, City Slab

Books edited
 Aegri Somnia (with Gill Ainsworth)  (2006). 
 Gratia Placenti: For the Sake of Pleasing (with Gill Ainsworth)  (2007).
 Descended From Darkness: Apex Magazine Vol. 1 (with Gill Ainsworth)  (2008).
 Apexology: Horror  (2010).
 Dark Futures: Tales of SF Dystopia  (2010).
 The Zombie Feed Vol. 1  (2011).
 Appalachian Undead (with Jonathan Maberry)  (2013).

References

External links

 Apex Magazine
 Apex Book Company
 Jason Sizemore's home page

Interviews
 Horrorview.com Interview
 Fantasy Magazine Interview
 Southsider Magazine Interview
 SF Signal Interview

Writers from Lexington, Kentucky
Year of birth missing (living people)
Living people
Male speculative fiction editors